Apostolos Vasilios Stamatelopoulos (born 9 April 1999) is an Australian professional footballer who plays as a forward for Greek Super League club PAS Giannina.

Career

Adelaide United
On 22 September 2017, Stamatelopoulos signed a 2-year scholarship contract with Adelaide United. In his fourth senior appearance for the club, he scored his first A-League goal off the bench to equalise in an away match against Western Sydney Wanderers on 10 January 2018.

Western United
On 20 March 2019, it was announced that Stamatelopoulos had signed for new A-League club Western United. On 25 January 2021, the club announced that Stamatelopoulos had departed.

Newcastle Jets
A few days after leaving Western United, it was announced Stamatelopoulos would join Newcastle Jets when the transfer window opens on 16 February.
Stamatelopoulos made his debut for the Jets as a substitute in a loss to Wellington on 28 February.

Personal life
Stamatelopoulos was born in Australia and is of Greek descent.

References

External links

1999 births
Living people
Australian soccer players
Australian expatriate soccer players
Association football forwards
Adelaide Comets FC players
Adelaide United FC players
Western United FC players
Newcastle Jets FC players
Rodos F.C. players
PAS Giannina F.C. players
National Premier Leagues players
A-League Men players
Super League Greece 2 players
Super League Greece players
Australian expatriate sportspeople in Greece
Expatriate footballers in Greece
Australian people of Greek descent
Soccer players from Adelaide